The Women's 200m Butterfly event at the 2007 Pan American Games took place at the Maria Lenk Aquatic Park in Rio de Janeiro, Brazil, with the final being swum on July 21.

Medalists

Results

Finals

Semifinals

Preliminaries

References
For the Record, Swimming World Magazine, September 2007 (p. 48+49)

Butterfly, Women's 200
2007 in women's swimming